= Katholischer Friedhof Köln-Mülheim =

Cemetery in Cologne, Germany

Coordinates: 50°57′21″N 7°00′32″E

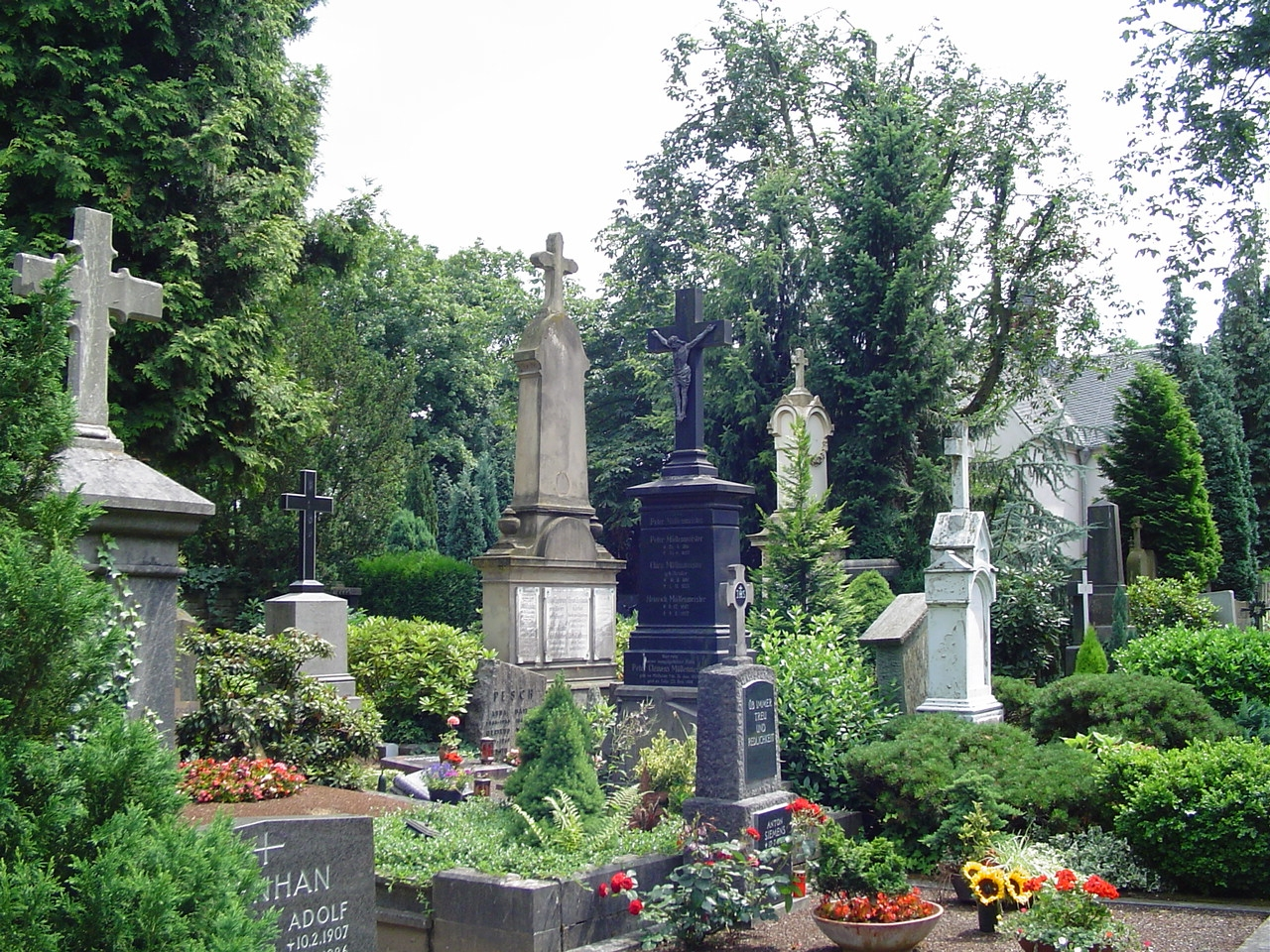

Katholischer Friedhof Köln-Mülheim is a cemetery in Cologne, Germany. The oldest gravestone dates to 1841.
